Seventeen Italian dog breeds are recognised by the Ente Nazionale della Cinofilia Italiana, of which fifteen are recognised also by the Fédération Cynologique Internationale. A further six are in the process of recognition by the ENCI. There are a number of local breeds or types without national recognition.

See also

 List of dog breeds

References

Dog breeds
Dog